James Talbot "Chubb" Vigne (23 December 1868 – 9 April 1955) was a South African international rugby union player.

Biography
Born in Fort Beaufort, and educated at New College, Eastbourne, Vigne first played provincial rugby for Transvaal (now known as the Golden Lions).

He was selected to play for South Africa during Great Britain's 1891 tour and played at centre for all three Tests of the series—his only appearances for South Africa. The series, which was South Africa's first as a Test nation, was won 3–0 by Great Britain.

As a cricketer, he represented Griqualand West in four first-class fixtures.

After his international career, Vigne owned a furniture shop in Kimberley. He died in 1955, in Kimberley, at the age of 86.

Test history

See also
List of South Africa national rugby union players – Springbok no. 3

References

1868 births
1955 deaths
People from Raymond Mhlaba Local Municipality
White South African people
South African rugby union players
South Africa international rugby union players
South African cricketers
Griqualand West cricketers
Rugby union players from the Eastern Cape
Rugby union centres
Golden Lions players